

About the temple 
This temple is situated in a place called Athipotta, which is 24 km from Palakkad via Alathur. The goddess in this temple is supposed to be in her very fierce form. She is also considered as the younger sister of Parakkattu Bhagwathi who has a temple in Kavasseri near by.

History 
Mangottu Bhagawathi is supposed to have come to this place to fulfill the desire of a weaver Kalambath Unni Mannadiar. This weaver, Unni, was a great devotee of the Goddess. Unni and his people wove clothes and sold them in places where festivals were held. He went for a festival at the place called mangod were the festival of the goddess in that place was held very poorly. By seeing the festival he wished that if the goddess was in our village the festival will be conducted in a very grand way. Then they returned to their own village called Athipotta and sat in a place to share their money earned in the sales. After sharing the profits when he try to take the ola kuda (umbrella) to return to his house he couldn't take it. Then an astrologer came to investigate the reasons he found that the goddess came with Kalambath Unni Mannadiar as per his wish in his umbrella. There is two beliefs that the Poomully manna thamburakanmaar (the rulers of village Athipotta at that time) constructed the temple which we see now and another belief is that the mannadiar society constructed the temple and given to Poomully manna thamburakanmaars to look after the temple because of financial crisis of mannadiar society. The place were the umbrella was situated is now called the Unni iruthy mooku(the moolasthanam)the hereditary rights of moolasthanam lie on kalambath tharavadu. The Mangottu bhagavathy and Unni Mannadiyar who brought Devi is also been worshiped in kalambath tharavad.In the seven days of Athipotta Mangottu kavu bagavathy's festival starts from the moolasthanam and in the absence of Velichappadu(Komaram)Bhagawathi's vaallu and chillambu which is used in the festival's rituals was kept in Poomulli mana and later it has been Moved to Mangottu kavu.

Important dates 
In the month of Medam (April–May) a festival is conducted here lasting seven days, after the first Sunday of that month. Apart from that after the Pooram festival of Parakkattu Bhagawathi temple, that Bhagawathi shuts her temple and comes and stays in Athipotha for seven days during the month of Meenam (March–April). 
Every year the annual festival (vela) is conducted on the second Sunday after Vishu (in April), the starting of the Malayalam new year.
The Mangottu Kavu vela is preceded by a host of festivities starting exactly a week before the actual festival. On the first Sunday after vishu the Kodiyattum (Flag raising) ceremony is performed. On Monday there is a kari-kali dance festival, wherein members of the Mannadiar and Nair community visit all the Hindu homes in the locality and dance and sing the deities devotional songs. On Tuesday chamanz-kali follows. Here too members of the Mannadiar and Nair community sing devotional songs visiting each Hindu home in the locality. Wednesday there is Kumati festival. There are other cultural events like Chakiyaar Kutt and Pavva Kutt during this festival period. A host of devotees arrive for the main vela festival.
This is a very important temple and various types of worship are offered here. Some of them are Pana Patasam, Ney Payasam, Tri kala pooja, Chandattam, Sahasranama pooja etc. There are also special poojas along with chanting of Eika mathya Sooktham, Sri Sooktham and Bhagya Suktham.  While there is a separate temple for Ganesa inside the temple, just outside is a temple for 'Mookan Chathan.

See also
 Temples of Kerala

External links 

Hindu temples in Palakkad district
Bhagavathi temples in Kerala